Lincoln is a suburb in West Auckland, New Zealand. It is also the filming location of Shortland Street. The suburb is sometimes called Lincoln North or treated as part of Henderson North to avoid confusion with Lincoln in Canterbury.

Demographics
Lincoln comprises four statistical areas. Henderson Larnoch, Henderson Lincoln West and Henderson Lincoln South are primarily residential. Henderson Lincoln East is primarily commercial.

Residential area

The residential areas had a population of 9,951 at the 2018 New Zealand census, an increase of 888 people (9.8%) since the 2013 census, and an increase of 1,506 people (17.8%) since the 2006 census. There were 2,859 households, comprising 4,965 males and 4,986 females, giving a sex ratio of 1.0 males per female, with 2,331 people (23.4%) aged under 15 years, 2,247 (22.6%) aged 15 to 29, 4,404 (44.3%) aged 30 to 64, and 972 (9.8%) aged 65 or older.

Ethnicities were 35.5% European/Pākehā, 18.7% Māori, 24.7% Pacific peoples, 34.5% Asian, and 4.0% other ethnicities. People may identify with more than one ethnicity.

The percentage of people born overseas was 43.5, compared with 27.1% nationally.

Although some people chose not to answer the census's question about religious affiliation, 35.4% had no religion, 44.7% were Christian, 1.5% had Māori religious beliefs, 5.7% were Hindu, 2.5% were Muslim, 2.6% were Buddhist and 2.3% had other religions.

Of those at least 15 years old, 1,509 (19.8%) people had a bachelor's or higher degree, and 1,503 (19.7%) people had no formal qualifications. 702 people (9.2%) earned over $70,000 compared to 17.2% nationally. The employment status of those at least 15 was that 3,783 (49.6%) people were employed full-time, 912 (12.0%) were part-time, and 468 (6.1%) were unemployed.

Commercial area

The commercial area had a population of 138 at the 2018 New Zealand census, a decrease of 171 people (−55.3%) since the 2013 census, and a decrease of 168 people (−54.9%) since the 2006 census. There were 24 households, comprising 75 males and 63 females, giving a sex ratio of 1.19 males per female. The median age was 35.2 years (compared with 37.4 years nationally), with 21 people (15.2%) aged under 15 years, 33 (23.9%) aged 15 to 29, 78 (56.5%) aged 30 to 64, and 9 (6.5%) aged 65 or older.

Ethnicities were 60.9% European/Pākehā, 10.9% Māori, 8.7% Pacific peoples, 30.4% Asian, and 4.3% other ethnicities. People may identify with more than one ethnicity.

The percentage of people born overseas was 34.8, compared with 27.1% nationally.

Although some people chose not to answer the census's question about religious affiliation, 30.4% had no religion, 56.5% were Christian, 4.3% were Hindu and 4.3% were Buddhist.

Of those at least 15 years old, 27 (23.1%) people had a bachelor's or higher degree, and 12 (10.3%) people had no formal qualifications. The median income was $24,500, compared with $31,800 nationally. 21 people (17.9%) earned over $70,000 compared to 17.2% nationally. The employment status of those at least 15 was that 60 (51.3%) people were employed full-time, 24 (20.5%) were part-time, and 6 (5.1%) were unemployed.

Individual statistical areas

Main Roads
The Northwestern Motorway passes through the northern part of the suburb, with the "Lincoln Road" junction providing access.

Lincoln Road runs through the suburb and is the main road for the suburb with Universal Drive and Central Park Drive the main support routes in and out of the suburbs.

Main centres
Lincoln North mall is a small shopping centre on the corner of Lincoln Road and Universal Drive, and across Universal Drive are a Pak'n Save supermarket and Mitre 10 megastore.

Schools

Pomaria Road School is a contributing primary (years 1-6) school with a roll of  students. The school opened about 1960. It has operated a Kohanga Reo (Māori language immersion kindergarten) since 1992.

ACG Sunderland School and College is a private school with a roll of  students.  They opened at the beginning of 2007.

Both schools are coeducational.  Rolls are as of 

Henderson High School, Liston College and St Dominic's College are in Henderson North to the south of Lincoln.

Notes

Suburbs of Auckland
Henderson-Massey Local Board Area
Populated places around the Waitematā Harbour
West Auckland, New Zealand